The Green Album or Green album may refer to:

 Days of the New (1999 album), colloquially known as the Green Album, by Days of the New
 The Green Album (John S. Hall and King Missile album)
 The Green Album (Kottonmouth Kings album), 2008
 The Green Album (Skankin' Pickle album), 1996
 Green (R.E.M. album), 1988
 Grinspoon (EP) or Green EP, 1995 début EP by Grinspoon
 Gumby (album), a 1989 album colloquially known as the Green Album
 Muppets: The Green Album, a 2011 Disney album featuring covers of Muppet songs by contemporary artists
 Orbital (1991 album), colloquially known as the Green Album, by Orbital
 Weezer (Green Album), 2001 album by Weezer, colloquially known as The Green Album
 Woods IV: The Green Album colloquially known as the Green Album, by Woods of Ypres
 The Green Album (Eddie Jobson album), 1983
 The Green Album, a 1992 album by the Boston Pops Orchestra conducted by John Williams

See also
 Green (disambiguation) § Albums
 The Green EP (disambiguation)